For other people with the same or similar name, see William Dietrich (disambiguation).

William Eric Dietrich (born 1950) is a professor of geology in the Department of Earth and Planetary Science at the University of California, Berkeley. His specialty is geomorphology, with a particular interest in the biological forces shaping landscapes. He obtained his Ph.D. in geology from the University of Washington. Dietrich was elected as a member of the United States National Academy of Sciences in 2003.  In 2009, he was awarded the Robert E. Horton Medal by the American Geophysical Union.

References

Living people
American geologists
Members of the United States National Academy of Sciences
University of Washington College of Arts and Sciences alumni
University of California, Berkeley College of Letters and Science faculty
American geomorphologists
1950 births